Karl Andreas Hofmann (2 April 1870 – 15 October 1940) was a German inorganic chemist. He is best known for his discovery of a family of clathrates which consist of a 2-D metal cyanide sheet, with every second metal also bound axially to two other ligands. These materials have been named 'Hofmann clathrates' in his honour.

Works
 Lehrbuch der Anorganischen Chemie . Vieweg, Braunschweig 2nd ed. 1919 Digital edition by the University and State Library Düsseldorf

References

1870 births
1940 deaths
19th-century German chemists
Inorganic chemists
20th-century German chemists
Ludwig Maximilian University of Munich alumni
Academic staff of the University of Tübingen
Academic staff of the Technical University of Berlin
Solid state chemists